The 2018–19 Bethune–Cookman Wildcats men's basketball team represented Bethune-Cookman University in the 2018–19 NCAA Division I men's basketball season. Led by second year head coach Ryan Ridder, they played their home games at Moore Gymnasium in Daytona Beach, Florida as members of the Mid-Eastern Athletic Conference. They finished the season 14–17 overall, 9–7 in MEAC play, finishing in a tie for fifth place. The team received a No. 5 seed in the MEAC tournament, where they were defeated 71–80 in the quarterfinals by No. 5 seed Howard.

Previous season
The Wildcats finished the 2017–18 season 18–14, 12–4 in MEAC play, finishing in a three-way tie for first. Due to tie-breaking procedures, they received the No. 2 seed in the MEAC tournament, where they lost to Morgan State in the quarterfinals.

Roster

Schedule and results

|-
!colspan=12 style=| Non-Conference Regular season

|-
!colspan=12 style=| MEAC regular season

|-
!colspan=12 style=| MEAC tournament
|-

|-

Source

References

Bethune–Cookman Wildcats men's basketball seasons
Bethune-Cookman Wildcats
Bethune-Cookman Wildcats men's basketball team
Bethune-Cookman Wildcats men's basketball team